Eduardo Bähr (born 1940 in Tela, Honduras) is a Honduran writer, scriptwriter and actor. 

In 1996, along with Mexico's Octavio Paz, Spain's Rafael Alberti, and Nicaragua's Ernesto Cardenal, he was one of 50 intellectuals awarded the Gabriela Mistral Medal by the government of Chile. For many years he taught Honduran and Latin-American Literature at the National University of Honduras, where he also directed the University Theater Company.

Segments of his novel El cuento de la guerra (The War Story) have been translated into English, French and German. The book's theme is the armed conflict between Honduras and El Salvador in 1969.

Bähr is a member of "Artistas de la Gente", a collective of five artists of different generations and disciplines who develop critical political art.

He is currently living in Tegucigalpa, where he runs a non-profit editorial service to promote publication among low-income Honduran and Central American artists and students.

Bibliography

1969, Fotografía del Peñasco.

1971, El Cuento de la Guerra; excerpt  Pichardos Sohn. Transl. José Antonio Friedl Zapata. In: Ein neuer Name, ein fremdes Gesicht. 26 Erzählungen aus Lateinamerika. Sammlung Luchterhand, 834. Neuwied, 1987, 1989, pp 69-79

1999. La Flora Maga. en Línea de Fuga, N°5, enero-marzo, México. y 1997-1998, "La Flora Maga" en L'ordinaire Latino-américain, N° 176, IPEALT, Toulouse, France.

2002, "Fondo de Reptiles", en Honduras: Prensa, Poder y Democracia, CEDOH, Tegucigalpa.

2003, El niño de la montaña de la Flor, Traducido al catalán por la Editorial Vilatana, España.

Popular education brochures : El Cabildo Abierto, Participación y Control Ciudadanos, Transparencia y Corrupción, La Sociedad Civil en Honduras, Democracia y Medios de Comunicación en Honduras, La Reforma Política de los Políticos, La Mentira Política de los Políticos, El pobre mundo de la pobrería.

Anthologies and translations

2006. Antología del Cuento Latinoamericano. Olver Gilberto de León / Rubén Bareiro-Saguier. Grupo La Gotera - Ediciones Espacio, Montevideo, 2006, 268, páginas.

2003, "Los Héroes de la fiebre" en Enríque Jaramillo Levi (comp.) Pequeñas Resistencias 2. Antología del Cuento Centroamericano Contemporáneo, VV.AA. Editorial: Editorial Páginas de Espuma, Colección Voces, volumen 32, Madrid.

1988, "The Fever Heroes" in Barbara Paschke and David Volpendesta, Clamor of Innocence: Stories from Central America (City Lights)

1994, Tarzan of the Apes, Contemporary short stories from Central America / edited by Enrique Jaramillo Levi and Leland H. Chambers; translations coordinated by Leland H. Chambers; translated by Lynne Beyer ... [et al.]. University of Texas Press.

1982 
La alcachofa es un caso de silogismo, in Liść wiatru : antologia opowiadań Ameryki Środkowej / wybrał, oprac. i posłowiem opatrzył Jerzy Kühn ; [przeł. [z hisz.] Jerzy Brzozowski i in.]. - Kraków[Polska] : Wydawnictwo Literackie, 1982

1981. Je serais incapable de vous jeter une pierre, in Anthologie de la Nouvelle Hispano-américaine, Olver Gilberto De León / Rubén Bareiro-Saguier, Editions Belfond, Paris, 1981, 284 p. (Portuguese edition in 1983)

Cinema
The Scattered Body and The World Upside Down / Utopia, TV, Germany. Directed by Raúl Ruiz. 1975;  Mensch verstreut und Welt verkehrt. 1976
No hay tierra sin dueño, Honduras, Director Sami Kafati. 2001
El viaje de Suyapa, Honduras, Director Katia Lara. 2007

External links
 Bähr's blog
 

Honduran male writers
Honduran short story writers
Male short story writers
1940 births
Living people
20th-century Honduran writers
21st-century Honduran writers